The 1941–42 Serbian League (Serbian: 1941–42 Српска лига / 1941–42 Srpska liga) was a top level football league of the German military administration in Serbia (Serbia under German occupation) in the 1941–42 season.  It was won by SK 1913.

Final table
Final table seen at September 15, 1942, at Sport newspaper.

See also
Serbian Football League (1940–1944)
Serbia under German occupation

References

Serbian Football League (1940–1944) seasons
Serbian League
Football
Football
Serbia
Serbia